The Keynes family is an English family that has included several notable economists, writers, and actors, including the economist John Maynard Keynes.

Family tree of modern Keynes family

History

The English surname Keynes is derived from a Norman place name, either Cahagnes (Calvados) or Cahaignes (Eure), which are documented as places of origin of people of this name or possibly also from similar placenames not so documented.

The earliest documented person in England bearing the name was William de Cahaignes from Normandy who was born around 1035. Of another Norman William de Cahaignes (born around 1060 and probably his son), Katharine Keats-Rohan writes:- "Norman, from Cahaignes, Calvados, arr. Vire, cant. Aunay-sur-Odon. Major tenant of Robert, Count of Mortain (half-brother of William the Conqueror) in several Domesday counties. He was Sheriff of Northamptonshire in 1086, and again in the early years of Henry I. His widow Adelicia made a grant for his soul to Lewes priory, with the assent of their son Hugh (Mon. Ang. v,14). His lands were divided between his three sons, of whom Hugh held the forest of Northamptonshire in 1129/30."

Surname derivatives
Surname variants include "Koine", "De Keynes", "Keynes", "de Cayenes", "Caynes", "Caines", "Cheyney", "Cheney", "Chaney", "Chaineis", "Cahaignes", "Casneto", "Caisned", "Casineto".

Places in England bearing the name Keynes
The following places were named after the de Cahaignes or Keynes family who held many manors in the years following the Norman Conquest:
 Ashton Keynes, Wiltshire
 Coombe Keynes, Dorset
 Horsted Keynes, West Sussex
 Milton Keynes, Buckinghamshire (derived from the original Milton Keynes)
 Somerford Keynes, Gloucestershire

Notable persons surnamed Keynes
See Keynes (disambiguation).

References

Sources
 Keats-Rohan, Katherine S. B. Domesday People: A Prosopography of Persons Occurring in English Documents, 1066–1166. 2v. Woodbridge, Suffolk: Boydell Press, 1999.

External links
  placenames reveal ancestral residence
 Victoria History of the Counties of England: 'Parishes : Milton Keynes', A History of the County of Buckingham: Volume 4 (1927), pp. 401-405.

 
Family trees
Darwin–Wedgwood family